The Punisher is the alias of the Marvel character Frank Castle, it can also refer to:
 The Punisher (1986 series), first series of the title
 The Punisher (1987 series), second series of the title
 The Punisher (1998 series), third series of the title
 The Punisher (2000 series), fourth series of the title
 The Punisher (2001 series), fifth series of the title
 The Punisher (2004 series), sixth series of the title
 The Punisher (2011 series), seventh series of the title
 The Punisher (2014 series), eight series of the title

See also
 List of Punisher titles

Punisher